The Money Jungle is a 1968 American drama film directed by Francis D. Lyon and written by Charles A. Wallace. The film stars John Ericson, Lola Albright, Leslie Parrish, Nehemiah Persoff, Charles Drake, Kent Smith and Don Rickles. The film was released in February 1968, by Commonwealth United Entertainment.

Plot

With five rival oil companies vying for offshore rights, their chief geologists begin dying under suspicious circumstances. A troubleshooter, Blake Heller, is brought in by one firm to investigate, resulting in almost immediate attempts on his life as well.

Heller takes a particular interest in two women, one a neighbor, Treva Saint, who has stock holdings in his oil company, and Peggy Lido, a nightclub singer. He eventually realizes that it is Peggy and her boyfriend, Paul Kimmel, who are behind the killings, Peggy gaining revenge for her former husband's business schemes.

Cast
John Ericson as Blake Heller
Lola Albright as Peggy Lido
Leslie Parrish as Treva Saint
Nehemiah Persoff as Lt. Dow Reeves
Charles Drake as Harvey Sheppard
Kent Smith as Paul Kimmel
Don Rickles as Harry Darkwater
Michael Forest as Haines Conjar
Mark Roberts as Joe Diguseppe
Edy Williams as Sabra McKinley
Marilyn Devin as George
Jim Adams as Sam
Leslie McRay as Sultry Voice & Legs
Dale Monroe as Doctor
Dodie Warren as Nurse
Dub Taylor as Pete Jensen
R.L. Armstrong as Ernie James 
John Cliff as Tongs Fowler
George DeNormand as Jim Houston 
Byrd Holland as Chet Manning
Richard Norris as Lou Sayre
Ed Parker as Cassidy

See also
List of American films of 1968

References

External links
 

1968 films
American drama films
1968 drama films
Films directed by Francis D. Lyon
United Pictures Corporation
Films scored by Paul Dunlap
1960s English-language films
1960s American films